Qian'an may refer to the following locations in China:

Qian'an, Hebei (迁安市), county-level city of Tangshan
Qian'an Town, Hebei (迁安镇)
Qian'an County (乾安县), Songyuan, Jilin
Qian'an, Jilin (乾安镇）